Emmy Noether was a German mathematician. This article lists the publications upon which her reputation is built (in part).

First epoch (1908–1919)

Second epoch (1920–1926)

In the second epoch, Noether turned her attention to the theory of rings.  With her paper Moduln in nichtkommutativen Bereichen, insbesondere aus Differential- und Differenzenausdrücken, Hermann Weyl states, "It is here for the first time that the Emmy Noether appears whom we all know, and who changed the face of algebra by her work."

Third epoch (1927–1935)

In the third epoch, Emmy Noether focused on non-commutative algebras, and unified much earlier work on the representation theory of groups.

References

Bibliography

 
 
 .

External links
 List of Emmy Noether's publications by Dr. Cordula Tollmien
 List of Emmy Noether's publications in the eulogy by Bartel Leendert van der Waerden
 Partial listing of important works at the Contributions of 20th century Women to Physics at UCLA
 MacTutor biography of Emmy Noether

Abstract algebra
Bibliographies by writer
Bibliographies of German writers
Science bibliographies